Paul Brew (born 20 November 1965) is a male retired swimmer who competed for Great Britain and Scotland.

Swimming career
Brew competed in the men's 400 metre individual medley at the 1988 Summer Olympics. He represented Scotland at the 1986 Commonwealth Games in Edinburgh, Scotland and at the 1990 Commonwealth Games in Auckland, New Zealand. At the ASA National British Championships he won the 200 metres medley title in 1984 and 1986  and the 400 metres medley title in 1989.

Personal life
His brother Robin Brew is also a former international swimmer.

References

External links
 

1965 births
Living people
British male swimmers
Scottish male swimmers
Olympic swimmers of Great Britain
Swimmers at the 1988 Summer Olympics
Place of birth missing (living people)
Swimmers at the 1986 Commonwealth Games
Swimmers at the 1990 Commonwealth Games
Commonwealth Games competitors for Scotland